Paul Barbă Neagră (or Barbăneagră) (February 11, 1929 – October 13, 2009) was a Romanian film director and essayist who, starting in 1957, has directed short and medium-length documentaries on topics related to culture and the arts. In 1964, he defected and settled in France, where he also worked in the media (for France 2, France 3, and Radio Free Europe).

Biography
Born in Isaccea, he studied medicine and cinematography in Bucharest, graduating from the I. L. Caragiale Institute for Theater and Film Arts. Between 1957 and 1964, he worked for the film studios of Communist Romania, and, during a visit to Tours (where he was attending the local film festival), sought political asylum.

He was awarded a first prize for the scenario of his film Versailles Palais-Temple du Roi Soleil ("Palace of Versailles, Temple of the Sun King") at the Festival International du Film d’Art (International Festival for Art Films). The film was the first in his series Architecture et Géographie sacrée ("Sacred Architecture and Geography"). To the same series belongs the documentary Mircea Eliade et la Redécouverte du Sacré ("Mircea Eliade and the Rediscovery of the Sacred").

In 1990, he was awarded The French Grand Prix for Audiovisual Arts for his entire activity.

In 2004, he published with Félix Schwarz Symbolique de Paris: Paris sacré, Paris mythique (Les Éditions du Huitième Jour, 2004).

See also
 List of Eastern Bloc defectors

Footnotes

External links
 FES festival - film agenda
 Short bio
 Paul Barbăneagră at Poliron.ro
 

1929 births
2009 deaths
People from Isaccea
Radio Free Europe/Radio Liberty people
Romanian expatriates in France
Romanian defectors
Romanian essayists
Romanian film directors
Romanian journalists
Romanian screenwriters
20th-century essayists
20th-century screenwriters
20th-century journalists
Caragiale National University of Theatre and Film alumni